The Obusier de 520 modèle 1916 was a French railway howitzer that was built during World War I, but did not see service before the war ended. One weapon was destroyed in firing trials and the other was captured by the Germans after France surrendered in 1940 and used by them in the siege of Leningrad. Both weapons were destroyed by premature detonations of shells in their barrels.

Design
These howitzers were ordered in 1916 from Schneider, but development was protracted and the first weapon wasn't delivered until late 1917. They used a combination of cradle recoil and sliding recoil to handle the recoil forces generated by firing its enormous shells. The mount was then jacked up and then moved back into firing position by hand-crank or electric motor. The gun had to be loaded at 0° elevation and thus had to be re-aimed for every shot. A prominent overhead trolley system mounted behind the gun carried the ammunition to the breech from the ammunition car. It fired shells weighing .

Combat history
The first howitzer was destroyed during firing trials at the range in Quiberon in July 1918 when a shell detonated prematurely in the barrel. The second gun was delivered in 1918, but didn't complete its firing trials before the war ended. It was placed in storage, but was not part of the French mobilization plans until after the war began so it needed to be refurbished before it could be committed to battle. It was captured in the Schneider workshops before it could fire a single round in anger.

The Germans placed it into service as the 52 cm Haubitze (E) 871(f) (French railroad howitzer) and it was assigned to Railroad Artillery Battery (Artillerie-Batterie (E.)) 686. It didn't participate in the opening stages of Operation Barbarossa, but arrived on the outskirts of Leningrad on 21 November 1941. It was destroyed when a shell detonated in the barrel on 5 January 1942. The abandoned wreckage was captured by the Soviets during Operation Iskra in 1943.

Notes

References
 François, Guy. Eisenbahnartillerie: Histoire de l'artillerie lourd sur voie ferrée allemande des origines à 1945. Paris: Editions Histoire et Fortifications, 2006
 Gander, Terry and Chamberlain, Peter. Weapons of the Third Reich: An Encyclopedic Survey of All Small Arms, Artillery and Special Weapons of the German Land Forces 1939-1945. New York: Doubleday, 1979 
 Hogg, Ian V. Allied Artillery of World War One. Ramsbury, Marlborough, Wiltshire: Crowood Press, 1998 
 Kosar, Franz. Eisenbahngeschütz der Welt. Stuttgart: Motorbook, 1999

Further reading
 Harry W Miller, United States Army Ordnance Department, Railway Artillery: A Report on the Characteristics, Scope of Utility, Etc., of Railway Artillery, Volume II. Pages 120-125. Washington : Government Print Office, 1921

External links

 Les Canons de l'Apocalypse
 http://octant.u-bourgogne.fr/portail/documentsafb//01PL05018.pdf

World War I howitzers
World War I artillery of France
Railway guns
World War I railway artillery of France
520 mm artillery